Hyperdermium is a genus of fungi in the family Cordycipitaceae. The genus was described in 2000, with Hyperdermium bertonii (formerly placed in Epichloe) as the type species.

References

Hypocreales genera
Cordycipitaceae
Taxa described in 2000